Soundwell, Bristol is a suburb of Bristol, England in the South Gloucestershire District. It is situated between Kingswood and Staple Hill.

Located centrally in the parish is St. Stephen's Anglican Church and St. Stephen's CofE junior school with approximately 300 pupils. The original St. Stephen's infants school was closed and demolished several years ago to allow for expansion of Soundwell College. Soundwell College was a college of further education, now merged with the City of Bristol College, which maintains a centre in the locality.

Soundwell was the home of Soundwell F.C. in the 1940s and 1950s.  The current team, Soundwell Victoria, plays in the Bristol and District League. The team play home games at the Star Ground behind Kingswood Leisure Centre, formerly known as Soundwell Swimming Baths before it was developed. The Star Ground was named after the Pub next to the Leisure Centre, although the pub has since been renamed "The Turnpike".

Soundwell and surrounding areas were also coal-mining communities in days gone past and also were well known for shoe and boot manufacturing.

The name appears to be derived from Old English sund, meaning "healthy".  There was once a healing well in the vicinity.

References 

Villages in South Gloucestershire District
Areas of Bristol